Károly Csapkay (29 May 1894 – 1 March 1966) commonly known as Karl Csapkay, was a Hungarian football player and manager from Budapest. As a player, he featured for Fiorentina before going on to manage several teams.

References

1894 births
1966 deaths
Footballers from Budapest
Hungarian footballers
Association football midfielders
Hungarian expatriate footballers
Expatriate footballers in Italy
Serie A players
ACF Fiorentina players
Hungarian expatriate sportspeople in Italy
Hungarian football managers
Hungarian expatriate football managers
Expatriate football managers in Italy
ACF Fiorentina managers
U.S. Triestina Calcio 1918 managers
Palermo F.C. managers
S.S.C. Napoli managers
Venezia F.C. managers
Pisa S.C. managers
MTK Budapest FC managers
Place of death missing
Nemzeti Bajnokság I managers